Bendigo East is an electoral district of the Legislative Assembly in the Australian state of Victoria. It covers an area of  covering the part of the city of Bendigo east of the Yungera railway line and surrounding rural areas to the north, east and south. It includes the Bendigo suburbs of East Bendigo, Epsom, Flora Hill, Junortoun, Kennington, Quarry Hill, Spring Gully, Strathdale, Strathfieldsaye and White Hills, and the surrounding towns of Axedale, Goornong, Huntly, Mandurang, Raywood and Sedgwick. It also includes parts of the localities of Eaglehawk, Elmore, Golden Square and Ravenswood, and the Bendigo campus of La Trobe University. It lies within the Northern Victoria Region of the upper house, the Legislative Council.

The electorate was first created in 1904 in what was then a relatively strong Labor area. It continuously returned Labor candidates from 1907 until its abolition in 1927, when it was merged with Bendigo West to create a single Bendigo electorate. It was recreated in 1985 as a marginal seat and was won by Liberal candidate Michael John, who went on to serve as a minister in the Kennett government. He was narrowly defeated by Labor candidate Jacinta Allan at the 1999 general election. Allan was re-elected at the 2002, 2006, 2010, 2014, 2018 and 2022 elections.

Members for Bendigo East

Election results

References

External links
 Electorate profile: Bendigo East District, Victorian Electoral Commission

1904 establishments in Australia
1927 disestablishments in Australia
1985 establishments in Australia
Electoral districts of Victoria (Australia)
Bendigo
Shire of Loddon